Bobby Norris (born 22 August 1986) is an English television personality, known for his appearances on the ITVBe reality series The Only Way Is Essex from 2012 until Norris announced his departure from the series in 2021.

Career
Norris made his television debut in the fourth series of the ITV2 (now ITVBe) series The Only Way Is Essex in 2012. During his tenure on the series, Norris has made appearances in various other British reality series, including Celebs Go Dating, Celebrity Ghost Hunt and Celebs on the Farm. In 2021, Norris announced that he would be stepping down from the regular cast of TOWIE and that he would not be appearing in the show’s 29th series to focus on his presenting career and take on his role of presenting the brand new TOWIE after show; “TOWIE: The Official After Party” where he will be going back stage and interviewing the cast on set and then bringing cast members into a studio every week to sit down for a 1 on 1 interview about the show and all the latest Essex gossip!!

Personal life
Norris is gay. In an interview with Victoria Derbyshire, he stated that people send him death threats and  "wish cancer" on him because of his sexuality. In 2019, he began a petition to make homophobia a criminal offence, and spoke in parliament about his campaign.

Filmography

References

External links
 

1986 births
English television personalities
Gay entertainers
Living people
English LGBT rights activists
Television personalities from Essex
21st-century LGBT people